The Volhynian Upland (volynska vysochyna) is an upland in western Ukraine, with its small northwestern part stretching into eastern Poland.

The Podolian Upland and the Volhynian Upland are sometimes grouped together as the Volhynian-Podolian Upland. It should be known that both uplands are separated by a plain called "Little Polesia".

Volhynian Upland lays between Western Bug and Korchyk River which is a tributary of Sluch River. Its surface is weakly wavy dissected by wide river valleys and gulches.

Geologically, it consists of Paleozoic deposits overlapped with rocks of Cretaceous system. There are karst forms of relief and in karstic depressions there exist small lakes. Among minerals there are chalk, black coal, peat, pegmatites, clays. Widespread there are peat bogs.

The geographic region consists of following distinct smaller sub-regions
 Sokal Hills
 Bug River Upland
 Horodło Hills
 Hrubieszow Valley
 Horokhiv Upland
 Povcha Upland
 Rivne Plateau
 Hoshcha Plateau
 Mizoch Ridge
 Shepetivka Plain

External links
 Volhynian Upland at the Ukrainian Soviet Encyclopedia.

Plateaus of Ukraine
Plateaus of Poland
Volhynian-Podolian Upland